The 4th Grand Prix de Rouen-les-Essarts was a non-championship Formula One motor race held on 11 July 1954 at the Rouen-Les-Essarts circuit, in Rouen, Normandy, France. The winner was Maurice Trintignant in a Ferrari 625. Trintignant also took pole and set fastest lap. B. Bira and Roy Salvadori were second and third in their Maserati 250Fs.

Classification

Race

References

Rouen
1954 in French motorsport